Dooky Chase’s Restaurant is a restaurant in Tremé neighborhood of New Orleans that in the 1950s and 1960s was known as a place for civil rights leaders to safely “meet and strategize.”

History
The restaurant opened in 1939 as a sandwich shop on Clairborne Avenue. It moved to Orleans Avenue in 1941 by owners Emile and Dooky Chase and five years later, their son and daughter-in-law Edgar "Dooky" Chase Jr. and Leah Chase took over. They "turned the sandwich shop into one of the few upscale establishments available for the city’s African American community to dine and socialize."

During the 1955 Godchaux Sugar  Refinery Strike, the restaurant was frequented by labor leaders planning for the lunch counter protests of Jerome Smith, Oretha Castle Haley, and Rudy Lombard. The restaurant was hit by a bomb thrown by someone in a passing car in May 1965.

Ray Charles wrote about the restaurant in his song "Early in the Morning" with the lyrics “I went to Dooky Chase to get something to eat. / The waitress looked at me and said, ‘Ray, you sure look beat.’ / Now, it’s early in the morning. . . / I ain’t got nothin’ but the blues.”

Honors and awards
The National Trust for Historic Preservation has said Leah Chase has been recognized internationally as the “Queen of Creole Cuisine.”

The National Trust for Historic Preservation and American Express awarded them one of 25 $40,000 Backing Historic Small Restaurants grants. In May 2021, was named one of 15 places on the Louisiana Civil Rights Trail.

References

External links
DOOKY CHASE’S RESTAURANT US Civil Roghts Trail

Restaurants in New Orleans
Creole restaurants in the United States
Tremé